The 1970 Scottish Cup Final was played on 11 April 1970 at Hampden Park in Glasgow and was the final of the 85th Scottish Cup. Aberdeen and Celtic contested the match, Aberdeen won the match 3–1 with a goal from Joe Harper and two from Derek McKay.

Match details

References

External links
 Video highlights from official British Movietone archive

1970
Cup Final
Scottish Cup Final 1970
Scottish Cup Final 1970
1970s in Glasgow
April 1970 sports events in the United Kingdom